An  (also  is an item of clerical clothing worn by Orthodox Christian monastics who are rassophor or above, including bishops.

Overview
In some traditions, monks leave the lappets hanging over the shoulders, but nuns bring them together and fasten them  behind the apostolnik.

Hierodeacons (i.e., monastic deacons) will remove the  when they are vested and serving at liturgical services; if they are not serving, however, they will wear it whenever attending services. Monks who have been ordained to minor orders (subdeacon, reader, altar server) do not wear the  when vested.

A metropolitan wears a white  with the same jewelled cross.

The Patriarch of Bulgaria wears a white  with small cross. The Patriarch of Romania also wears a white .

References
Pictures of Epanokalimavkion and other clerical headgear 

Headgear
Eastern Christian vestments

Hats
Eastern Christian monasticism